Polini S.p.A. is an Italian manufacturer of tuning parts for motorcycles, mopeds, and scooters. Among other products, they produce cylinders and variators for both racing and road use. They also produce pocket bikes with 50cc up to 15 hp.

The company was founded when the Italian soldier Battista Polini returned from his service in World War II and started making bicycles, which sold very well. The first logo of the company was a ram, which was the coat of arms of Battista's battalion. When the first Vespa and Lambretta scooters emerged in the 1940s, manufacture of parts for these was started.

Today, Polini is owned by Battista Polini's three sons Carlo, Franco, and Piero. Tuning parts are manufactured for all major brands of scooters and motorcycles. Polini also produces a line of miniature folding scooters called SkAtE.

The company has also produced very small engines—notably the Polini Thor 250 / 250-DS water-cooled, two-stroke engine—for use in paramotors for powered parachutes, and in ultralight aircraft. Though that line is apparently discontinued, the engines remain listed, on the menu of its website, as "Out of Stock Models," and remain available, used, and in wide use on active aircraft.

Polini's main competitor is Malossi, which is also based in Italy.

See also

List of Italian companies

References

External links 
 

Motorcycle manufacturers of Italy
Auto parts suppliers of Italy
Automotive motorsports and performance companies
Manufacturing companies established in 1946
Italian companies established in 1946
Italian brands
Companies based in Lombardy
Scooter manufacturers
Moped manufacturers
Motorcycle parts manufacturers
Motorcycle technology
Minibikes
Two-stroke gasoline engines
Engine manufacturers of Italy